In algebraic geometry, the lemniscate of Gerono, or lemniscate of Huygens, or figure-eight curve, is a plane algebraic curve of degree four and genus zero and is a lemniscate curve shaped like an  symbol, or figure eight. It has equation

It was studied by Camille-Christophe Gerono.

Parameterization
Because the curve is of genus zero, it can be parametrized by rational functions; one means of doing that is

Another representation is

which reveals that this lemniscate is a special case of a Lissajous figure.

Dual curve
The dual curve (see Plücker formula), pictured below, has therefore a somewhat different character. Its equation is

References

External links

Algebraic curves
Christiaan Huygens